Jacqueline Auriol (5 November 1917, Challans, Vendée – 11 February 2000) was a French aviator who set several world speed records.

Biography

Born  in Challans, Vendée, the daughter of a wealthy shipbuilder, Edmond Pierre Douet, she graduated from the University of Nantes then she studied art at the École du Louvre in Paris.

In 1938, she married Paul Auriol, son of Vincent Auriol (who would later become President of France). During World War II, she worked against the German occupation of France by helping the French Resistance.

She took up flying in 1946, got her pilot's license in 1948 and became an accomplished stunt flier and test pilot. Auriol was severely injured in a crash of a SCAN 30 in which she was a passenger in 1949—many of the bones in her face were broken—and spent nearly three years in hospitals undergoing 33 reconstructive operations. To occupy her mind she studied algebra, trigonometry, aerodynamics, and other subjects necessary to obtain advanced pilot certification.

She earned a military pilot license in 1950 then qualified as one of the first female test pilots. She was among the first women to break the sound barrier and set five world speed records in the 1950s and 1960s.

On four occasions she was awarded the Harmon International Trophy by an American president in recognition of her aviation exploits. She once explained her passion for flying by saying: "I feel so happy when I'm flying. Perhaps it is the feeling of power, the pleasure of dominating a machine as beautiful as a Thoroughbred horse. Mingled with these basic joys is another less primitive feeling, that of a mission accomplished. Each time I set foot on an airfield, I sense with fresh excitement that this is where I belong."

Her life story was told in her 1970 autobiography I Live to Fly'’ published in the French and English languages.

Auriol and her husband divorced in 1967 and remarried in 1987. They had two children  together, both boys. In 1983 she became a founding member of the French Académie de l'air et de l'espace.

Records
Auriol set the following speed records:

12 May 1951 - Auriol set a Fédération Aéronautique Internationale- (FAI-) ratified average speed of  flying a British-made Vampire over a 100-km (62.1-mile) closed circuit in France from Istres, outside Marseilles, to Avignon and back to claim the women's world air speed record from its previous holder, Jacqueline Cochran of the United States.
The new record was set over the same 100-km (62.1-mile) closed course as in 1951, from Istres to Avignon and back.
It was her final attempt to break the women's air speed record over that distance, and she broke a record Jacqueline Cochran had set over the distance in May 1963.

Honours
 She was awarded four Harmon Trophies in 1951,1952,1953 and 1956.
 She was made Grand officier (Grand officer) of the Légion d'honneur.
 She was made grand-croix (Grand cross) of the Ordre national du Mérite in 1997.
 Honored as an Eagle in 1992.
On 23 June 2003, France issued a €4.00 postage stamp in her honor.

Sources
 I Live to Fly'' - Jacqueline Auriol. (1970) E.P. Dutton & Co.: New York;

See also
Jacqueline Cochran

References

External links
 Biography on the Air University website
 Jacqueline Auriol's obituary in the La Dépêche newspaper 
 Supersonic women: a duel in the sky by Fabrice Hourlier

Further reading

1917 births
2000 deaths
People from Vendée
Female resistance members of World War II
French Resistance members
Grand Cross of the Ordre national du Mérite
Grand Officiers of the Légion d'honneur
Harmon Trophy winners
University of Nantes alumni
École du Louvre alumni
French women aviators
French aviation record holders
Concorde pilots
French women in World War II
French women aviation record holders
20th-century French women